Cai Jiani (born 1982) is a former Chinese badminton player from the Fujian Kaisheng club who was specializes in doubles. She had won some international tournaments in Europe, and at the 2008 Austrian International, 2008 Portugal International, 2009 Estonian International, she won doubles titles in women's and mixed doubles event.

Achievements

BWF International Challenge/Asian Satellite
Women's singles

Women's doubles

Mixed doubles

 BWF International Series/ Asian Satellite tournament

References

External links 
 

1982 births
Living people
Chinese female badminton players
Badminton players from Fujian
21st-century Chinese women